Ioveta of Jerusalem (c. 1120 - after 1161, before 1178), was a princess of Jerusalem and an abbess of the Sisters of Bethany. Her name appears in various forms, including Joveta, Jovita, Jowita, Yvette, Iveta, Ivetta, and even Juditta.

Life 
Ioveta was the fourth and youngest daughter of King Baldwin II of Jerusalem and Morphia of Melitene. She was the only one of Baldwin's daughters born after he became king in 1118. When Baldwin was taken captive by the Ortoqids near Edessa in 1123, Ioveta was one of the hostages given for his release. She was held at Shaizar until being ransomed to Baldwin in 1125 for eighty thousand dinars. Her ransom was gathered from the spoils taken after Baldwin's victory at the Battle of Azaz that year.

Her sister Melisende, married Fulk V of Anjou and succeeded Baldwin to the throne of the Kingdom of Jerusalem, her sister Alice married Bohemund II of Antioch, and her sister Hodierna married Raymond II of Tripoli. Ioveta, on the other hand, entered the Convent of St. Anne in Jerusalem.

Abbess
In 1143 Melisende built a convent dedicated to St. Lazarus at Bethany, on land purchased from the Latin patriarch of Jerusalem. After the death of the elderly first abbess, Ioveta was elected to the position in 1144. Though not as influential as her sisters, she had some power as abbess; a charter from 1157 survives in which she donated land to the Knights Hospitaller.

Ioveta was responsible for the education of her grandniece Sibylla. Sibylla was the daughter of her nephew.

Ioveta and her sisters were very close. When Melisende lay dying in 1161, Ioveta and Hodierna were at her side (Alice had probably died sometime earlier). After this Ioveta disappears from history; the date of her own death is unknown, but she was dead by 1178, when another abbess appears at the Convent of St. Lazarus.

Sources
William of Tyre, A History of Deeds Done Beyond the Sea. E. A. Babcock and A. C. Krey, trans. Columbia University Press, 1943.
Steven Runciman, A History of the Crusades, vol. II: The Kingdom of Jerusalem. Cambridge University Press, 1952.

Further reading
Erin Jordan, "Hostage, Sister, Abbess: The Life of Iveta of Jerusalem", Medieval Prosopography 32 (2017), pp. 66-86.

1120s births
Year of birth uncertain
Year of death uncertain
Women of the Crusader states
12th-century Christian nuns
Daughters of kings
Royalty of the Kingdom of Jerusalem